Cook Islands participated at the 2018 Summer Youth Olympics in Buenos Aires, Argentina from 6 October to 18 October 2018.

Swimming

The Cook Islands qualified 1 athlete.

Boys

References

Nations at the 2018 Summer Youth Olympics
Cook Islands at the Youth Olympics
2018 in Cook Islands sport